Group B of UEFA Euro 2008 was played from 8 to 16 June 2008. All six of the group's matches were played at venues in Austria, in Vienna and Klagenfurt. The group was made up of four central European nations; co-hosts Austria, as well as Croatia, Germany and Poland. Austria and Poland were appearing in a European Championship finals for the first time.

Croatia became the first team from the group to qualify for the quarter-finals after following up a 1–0 victory against Austria in their first match with a 2–1 win over Germany. This, in conjunction with Austria's 1–1 draw with Poland, meant that Croatia finish top of Group B. The second quarter-final berth was decided by the group's final matches, with Germany defeating Austria through a Michael Ballack free kick, making the result of the Poland vs. Croatia match irrelevant. Had Germany lost, Poland could still have qualified with a win over Croatia. However, a goal from Ivan Klasnić won the game for Croatia, making the Croatians the first team to gain maximum points in the group stage.

Teams

Notes

Standings

In the quarter-finals,
The winner of Group B, Croatia, advanced to play the runner-up of Group A, Turkey.
The runner-up of Group B, Germany, advanced to play the winner of Group A, Portugal.

Matches

Austria vs Croatia

Germany vs Poland

Croatia vs Germany

Austria vs Poland

Poland vs Croatia

Austria vs Germany

Notes

References

External links
UEFA Euro 2008 Group B

Group B
Group
Group
Group
Group